John Grattan (1800, Dublin -1871)  was an Irish naturalist and anthropologist.

John Grattan was an apothecary in Belfast. He had wide interests in natural history and was a member of the Belfast Natural History Society but is best known for his work on  ancient Irish skulls collected by his friend Edmund Getty. He devised a system of skull measurements using an ingenious craniometer. "Grattan's work was almost contemporaneous with that of Anders Retzius, and nearly all of it was done before the German and French Schools had elaborated their schemes of skull measurementsReferences

External links
 On the Importance, to the Archæologist and Ethnologist, of an Accurate Mode of Measuring Human Crania, and of Recording the Results; With the Description of a New Craniometer The Ulster Journal of Archæology''
 Notice of the Examination of an Ancient Sepulchral Mound The Ulster Journal of Archaeology

Irish naturalists
Scientists from Belfast
Irish anthropologists
1800 births
1871 deaths
19th-century Irish scientists